Juan Pablo Meza Tepezano (born 13 August 1993) is a Mexican professional footballer who plays as a defender for Liga MX club Querétaro.

External links
 
 

1993 births
Living people
Sportspeople from Culiacán
Mexican footballers
Footballers from Sinaloa
Association football defenders
Dorados de Sinaloa footballers
Correcaminos UAT footballers
Club Tijuana footballers